Edward D. Grover (October 23, 1932 – November 22, 2016) was an American film, stage and television actor. He was perhaps best known for playing Tony Baretta's supervisor Lieutenant Hal Brubaker in the American detective television series Baretta. Grover also played as Inspector Lombardo in the 1973 film Serpico.

Grover was born in Huntington Park, California, the son of Edna and A. Dee Grover. After living in Colorado and Illinois, Grover attended DeVilbiss High School in Toledo where he graduated in 1950. After serving in the Korean War from 1954 to 1956 Grover was awarded a bachelor's degree by the University of Toledo in 1957, and received a scholarship for postgraduate study at the University of Texas at Austin in 1958. He graduated from the American Shakespeare Festival Academy before studying theatre at Juilliard School. Grover began his acting career in 1959. He performed with the repertory theatre, Oregon Shakespeare Festival, and also with the McCarter Company and at Antioch College Shakespeare Festival.

Grover guest-starred in television programs including The Jeffersons, Archie Bunker's Place, The Ropers, One Day at a Time, Hill Street Blues, Quincy, M.E., The Greatest American Hero, The A-Team, Fantasy Island and Hart to Hart. He starred in the 1973 film Who?, where Grover played Finchley. He played Adam Reynolds in the soap opera television series The Doctors. Grover appeared in the films Death Wish, Serpico, Law and Disorder and Report to the Commissioner. He retired from acting in 2008.

Grover was also known for voice-over work for iconic commercials such as the 1984 Apple Macintosh introduction, Visa's "Everywhere" campaign, Delta Air Lines, and Nissan advertising.

Grover died in November 2016 in Rolling Hills Estates, California, at the age of 84.

References

External links 

Rotten Tomatoes profile

1932 births
2016 deaths
People from Huntington Park, California
Male actors from California
American male film actors
American male television actors
American male stage actors
American male soap opera actors
20th-century American male actors
21st-century American male actors
University of Toledo alumni
University of Texas at Austin alumni
United States Army personnel of the Korean War